Jeff Locke may refer to:

Jeff Locke (American football) (born 1989), American football punter
Jeff Locke (baseball) (born 1987), American baseball pitcher
Jeff Locke, guitarist and vocalist for Christian punk band The Blamed